Steep Point is the westernmost point of mainland Australia. It is also a part of the Shark Bay World Heritage Site.
The point was named Steyle Hock by Willem de Vlamingh  in 1697.

Access 
Access to Steep Point is by four-wheel drive vehicles only, as tracks to the point are through sand dunes. Camping areas and basic facilities are also available in the park and can be purchased at the ranger's house.

Access to the island is possible via a ferry from Blackie's Beach east of Shelter Bay across South Passage to Cape Ransonnet, the closest point on Dirk Hartog Island to Blackie's Beach.

Steep Point is one of Australia's most renowned land-based game fishing places, with over 320 different species of fish that have been caught off the point, where mackerel, sailfish and trevally are the most common. Serious fishers harness themselves onto the point, float their baits off the cliff using helium balloons and haul their catch up uses specially designed fishing gaffs, however it is very common that a shark steals the fisher's catch before they can haul it up onto land.

Steep Point is commonly known for the "final sunset" in Australia.

Steep Point is a reference point for other places and points of interests. For example, the location of the shipwreck HMAS Sydney is cited from the point. In 1994 a pamphlet of the title was produced about the wrecks along the coast.

It was triggered by the Pangandaran earthquake off the coast of Java in Indonesia.

South of Steep Point, a monument commemorates the sinking of the prawn trawler Nor 6 in 1963 and the story of the survival of its skipper, Jack Drinan.

See also
 Extreme Points of Australia

References

Shark Bay
Headlands of Western Australia
Extreme points of Western Australia